Okfuskee are a Muscogee tribe. Alternative spellings include the traditional Mvskoke spelling "Akfvske", referring to the tribal town in Alabama, and the comparable spelling Oakfuskee. They formed part of the former Creek (Muscogee) Confederacy in Alabama, prior to their removal during the 1830s to the Indian Territory. Okfuskee County, Oklahoma is named for a settlement where members of the tribe formerly lived.

References

Muscogee
Native American tribes in Alabama
Indigenous peoples of the Southeastern Woodlands